Ursulaea macvaughii is a plant species in the genus Ursulaea. This species is endemic to Mexico.

References

macvaughii
Endemic flora of Mexico